The 2009 FIBA Europe SuperCup Women was the first edition of the FIBA Europe SuperCup Women. It was held on 20 October 2009 in Vidnoye Sport Palace, Vidnoye, Russia.

Time
Times are EET (UTC+3).

Final

References

External links
 SuperCup Women

2009
2009–10 in European women's basketball
2009–10 in Russian basketball
2009
Sport in Moscow Oblast
2009–10 in Turkish basketball